Emil Börje Fornstedt (4 February 1926 – 22 September 2015) was a Swedish tennis player.

Tennis career
In 1948 Fornstedt won the Scandinavian singles championships held in Copenhagen beating Kurt Nielsen, 1–6, 7–5, 6–1, 6–2 in the final and he also won the  doubles, with Sven Davidson. During July 1948 he represented Sweden in the Davis Cup Europe Zone final against Czechoslovakia.

In September 1949 he won the Aachen Invitational Tournament in Germany, beating Ernst Buchholz in the final and in October 1949 he won the first Israeli International Championships, with a victory over Yehuda Finkelkraut in the final. Fornstedt participated in two Grand Slam events, the 1948 Wimbledon Championships and the 1952 French Open.

He together with Sven Davidson, among others, were also the founders of the Stockholm Open, that was founded in 1969.

See also
List of Sweden Davis Cup team representatives

References

External links
  
 

1926 births
2015 deaths
Swedish male tennis players
People from Ovanåker Municipality
Sportspeople from Gävleborg County